The Lemon Range or Lemon Mountains is a mountain range in King Christian IX Land, eastern Greenland. Administratively this range is part of the Sermersooq Municipality.

History
The range was named by Gino Watkins after Captain Percy Lemon (1898–1932) of the Royal Corps of Signals, a member of the 1930-31 British Arctic Air Route Expedition led by Watkins.

Although not as high as the Watkins Range to the east or the Lindbergh Range to the northeast, the Lemon Range has become a popular place among climbers because it has some of the steepest rock peaks in Greenland and the quality of the granite is good. A number of the main summits of the range were climbed for the first time by Chris Bonington in the 1990s.

Geography
The Lemon Range is an up to 2,500 m high mountain massif made up of nunataks. It is located among the glaciers east of Courtauld Glacier which has its terminus in the Cortauld Fjord, an arm of Kangerlussuaq Fjord, East Greenland, and west of Frederiksborg Glacier which flows roughly southwards with its terminus in the Watkins Fjord further south. The area of the range is uninhabited.

Mountains

 Actress (2,514 m); highest peak at 
 Beacon (2,077 m)
 Bidvest Peak (1,915 m)
 The Castle (1,798 m)
 Chisel (2,300 m)
 The Citadel (2,275 m)
 Coxcomb (1,970 m)
 Domkirkebjerget (2,458 m), peak cluster; highest peak known as 'The Cathedral'.
 Ivory Tower (1,974 m)
 Mejslen (2,083 m)
 Mitivagkat (1,893 m)
 Muezzin (1,771 m)
 The Needle (1,701 m)
 The Pulpit (2,110 m)
 The Scalpel (2,161 m)
 Solstice Peak (1,750 m)
 The Spire (2,260 m)
 The Steeple (2,360 m)
 The Vestry (2,215 m)

Glaciers
Besides the Courtauld Glacier and Frederiksborg Glacier that limit the range, the following glaciers lie within the boundaries of the Lemon Mountains:

 Chisel Glacier
 Coxcomb Glacier
 Hedgehog Glacier
 Porpoise Glacier
 Sarah Glacier
 Sidegetscher

Climate
Polar climate prevails in the region. The average annual temperature in the area of the Lemon Range is -14 °C. The warmest month is July when the average temperature reaches -2 °C and the coldest is February when the temperature sinks to -22 °C.

See also
List of mountain ranges of Greenland

References

External links
American Alpine Club - Exploring Greenland's Lemon Bjerge
American Alpine Club - North America, Greenland, Peaks in the Lindberg Bjerge; Cathedral and Other Peaks in the Lemon Bjerge

Mountain ranges of Greenland
Nunataks of Greenland
Sermersooq